Dominique Robertson (born July 21, 1994) is an American football offensive guard. He played college football for West Georgia. He was undrafted in the 2016 NFL Draft.

Shooting incident
On July 3, 2016, Robertson was hospitalized for two gunshot wounds in his leg. He was shot by unknown assailant around 3 A.M. at Loma Linda, California while with a friend.

References

External links
UWG Wolves bio

Tampa Bay Buccaneers players
1994 births
Living people
People from Riverside, California
American football offensive guards
West Georgia Wolves football players